12th Brigade or 12th Infantry Brigade may refer to:

Argentina
 12th Jungle Brigade (Argentina)

Australia
 12th Brigade (Australia)

India
 12th Cavalry Brigade (British Indian Army) of the British Indian Army in the First World War, distinct from the one below
 12th Indian Cavalry Brigade of the British Indian Army in the First World War, distinct from the one above
 12th Indian Brigade of the British Indian Army in the First World War
 12th Indian Infantry Brigade of the British Indian Army in the Second World War

Israel
 12th Negev Brigade

Japan
 12th Brigade (Japan)

Spain
 XII International Brigade

United Kingdom
 12th Mechanised Brigade (United Kingdom)
 12th Mounted Brigade (United Kingdom)
 Artillery Brigades
 12th (Howitzer) Brigade Royal Field Artillery
 XII Brigade, Royal Horse Artillery

United States
 12th Combat Aviation Brigade (United States)

See also
 12th Division (disambiguation)
 12th Battalion (disambiguation)
 12th Group (disambiguation)
 12th Regiment (disambiguation)
 12 Squadron (disambiguation)